Army Institute of Business Administration, commonly known as Army IBA, is a business school run by the Bangladesh Army in affiliation with the Bangladesh University of Professionals in Savar Cantonment, Savar, Dhaka.

History 
Army IBA was established on January 15, 2015, by the Bangladesh Army, under the direction of Prime Minister Sheikh Hasina, and was inaugurated on March 5, 2015, by the former Education Minister, Nurul Islam Nahid. The institute initially offered only a BBA degree, and 40 students were enrolled in the first batch.

Administration

Governing body
Army IBA is subject to the regulations set out by the Bangladesh University of Professionals. The institute is chaired by the Area Commander, Savar, and governed by the Board of Governors. The Director General (DG) is responsible for the overall management of the institution. The present Director General (DG) of Army IBA is Major General Mohammad Quamruzzaman, PSC, GSC (Retd).

Board of trustees 
A board, including the Chief of Army Staff (General) and the Vice-Chancellor of the Bangladesh University of Professionals, supervises the affairs of the institute.

Academic Council
The Academic Council reviews academic programs of Army IBA. All Instructors and Associate Professors of Army IBA are members of the board, and the Director General of Army IBA is the chairperson of the board.

Academics 
Army IBA confers Bachelor of Business Administration (BBA) degree for undergraduates and Master of Business Administration (MBA) degree for graduates with major areas of specialization in Marketing, Supply Chain Management, Human Resource Management, Finance, and Accounting. The Bangladesh University of Professionals (BUP) administers the academic curriculum in accordance with the rules of the University Grants Commission of Bangladesh.

Students organizations
Army IBA Business & Leadership Club
Army IBA Cultural Club
Army IBA Sports Club
Army IBA Literature & Debating Club
Army IBA Research & Development Club
Army IBA Production & Operations Management Club
Army IBA Finance & Accounting Forum
Army IBA Film & Photographic Society
Army IBA Career Enhancement Club
Army IBA Marketing & Innovation Club

Admission procedure 
Students must pass through a selection procedure. Only students meeting the minimum required grade point average (GPA) in HSC and SSC may take the admission exam. This record accounts for 25% of the total admission test score. Then students must write a 100 mark test which accounts for 50% of the total admission test score. Students selected from the written test must then pass a communication skill test (viva) which contains 25% of the total admission test score. Finally, 80-100 students are selected from candidates who have achieved the best scores in all three stages.

See also 
 Bangladesh University of Professionals (BUP)
 Military Institute of Science and Technology (MIST)
 Armed Forces Medical College (AFMC)

References

External links 
 Official website of Army IBA
 Official website of Bangladesh University of Professionals
Official website of Bangladesh Army

Bangladesh University of Professionals
Educational Institutions affiliated with Bangladesh Army